Céline is a 2008 television unauthorized film biopic about the life of Canadian singer Celine Dion. The film chronicles Dion's life from a young girl singing in her father's club, right through her career as a worldwide successful singer to the present day. It was directed by Jeff Woolnough.

Cast
 Christine Ghawi as Céline Dion
 Jodelle Ferland as Young Celine
 Peter MacNeill as Adhemar Dion
 Louise Pitre as Thérèse Dion
 Mac Fyfe as Michel
 Natalie Radford
 Enrico Colantoni as René Angélil

Awards
Christine Ghawi won the Gemini Award for Best Actress in a Television Film or Miniseries at the 24th Gemini Awards in 2009. The film was also nominated for Best TV Movie and Best Writing in a Dramatic Program or Miniseries (Donald Martin).

References

External links
 

2008 television films
2008 films
Canadian drama television films
English-language Canadian films
Films set in Quebec
Films shot in Ontario
2000s biographical films
Biographical films about musicians
Biographical films about singers
Celine Dion
Canadian musical films
Cultural depictions of Canadian women
Cultural depictions of pop musicians
Canadian biographical films
Films directed by Jeff Woolnough
2000s Canadian films
CBC Television original films